Sapheneutis pulchella is a species of bagworm moth native to eastern Madagascar.

Biology
The male has a wingspan of 21 mm, length of the forewings: 10 mm. The female has a wingspan between 21 and 31 mm.

Forewings are rounded with nine veins, white with black dots, hindwings are uniformly white with six veins.
Antenna has 52 segments densely scaled, the eyes are black and large, the eye height is approx. 3.5 times the distance of the eyes.

The types had been found on trees with lichens and were found around Andasibe, Moramanga.

See also
 List of moths of Madagascar

References
 

Psychidae
Lepidoptera of Madagascar
Moths described in 2010
Moths of Madagascar
Moths of Africa